The Veligallu Dam Reservoir Project is an irrigation project across Papagni River near Galiveedu in Kadapa district of Andhra Pradesh, India. The project's goal is to allow for the irrigation of a total of 24,000 acres (Galiveedu, Lakkireddypalli and Ramapuram Mandals of Rayachoti Taluk) in Rayachoti Taluk of Kadapa district and for drinking water provision for a population of 1 Lakh. The project's anticipated gross storage capacity is 4.64 Tmcft.

References

Penner River
Dams in Andhra Pradesh
Reservoirs in Andhra Pradesh
Buildings and structures in Kadapa district
Proposed infrastructure in Andhra Pradesh
Geography of Kadapa district